Olivaceous bulbul may refer to:

 Puff-throated bulbul, a species of bird found in Southeast Asia 
 Réunion bulbul, a species of bird endemic to Réunion 

Birds by common name